Keith Thomas Jacobs Jr. (February 13, 1935 – July 9, 2022) was an American professional golfer and golf course owner/operator who played on the PGA Tour and the Champions Tour. He was the older brother of John Jacobs who has also played on the PGA Tour and is a current player on the Champions Tour.

Jacobs was born in Denver, Colorado, and raised in southern California, where he started in junior golf. In 1951, Jacobs won the U.S. Junior Amateur. At sixteen, he advanced to the semifinals of the U.S. Amateur, which earned him an invitation to the Masters Tournament at age 17. For 58 years, Jacobs had the distinction of being the youngest golfer to ever play in the Masters (in 1952). The record was broken by Matteo Manassero in 2010. He turned professional in 1956.

Jacobs won four PGA Tour events. His first win came in 1958 at the newly revamped Denver Open, and his last was at the 1964 Palm Springs Golf Classic. During his career, Jacobs had sole 2nd-place finishes in two major championships. He lost the 1964 U.S. Open to Ken Venturi by four strokes, and was runner-up in a playoff at the Masters Tournament in 1966 that he (72) and Gay Brewer (78) lost to Jack Nicklaus (70). Jacobs was a member of the 1965 Ryder Cup team, and finished with a record of 3-1-1.

Jacobs joined the Senior PGA Tour (now known as the Champions Tour) in 1985 and continued to play in selected events into the 2000s; his last appearance was at the 2003 Senior PGA Championship.

Jacobs and his brother John teamed up with Roger Fredericks, to form Champions Corporate Golf Outings, which provides custom tailored golf events for small to medium size groups and corporations.

Jacobs died on July 9, 2022, at the age of 87.

Professional wins (7)

PGA Tour wins (4)

PGA Tour playoff record (2–2)

Other wins (3)
1971 Southern California PGA Championship
1972 Southern California PGA Championship
1976 Southern California PGA Championship

Results in major championships
Amateur

Professional

CUT = missed the half-way cut (3rd round cut in 1960 and 1964 PGA Championships)
R64 = Round in which player lost in match play
"T" indicates a tie for a place

Source for Masters, U.S. Open, Open Championship, British Amateur, PGA Championship

Summary

Most consecutive cuts made – 5 (1962 U.S. Open – 1963 PGA)
Longest streak of top-10s – 1 (five times)

Team appearances
Ryder Cup: 1965 (winners)
Diamondhead Cup: 1974 (winners)

References

External links

American male golfers
PGA Tour golfers
PGA Tour Champions golfers
Ryder Cup competitors for the United States
Golfers from Denver
Golfers from California
Golfers from North Carolina
Sportspeople from Palm Springs, California
People from Brunswick County, North Carolina
1935 births
2022 deaths